The 1946–47 Rugby Union County Championship was the 47th edition of England's premier rugby union club competition at the time.

Lancashire won the competition for the fourth time after defeating Gloucestershire in a replayed final.

Semifinals

Final

Final

See also
 English rugby union system
 Rugby union in England

References

Rugby Union County Championship
County Championship (rugby union) seasons